The Clinical Information Access Portal, commonly referred to as CIAP, is a project of the New South Wales Department of Health that provides online clinical resources for health professionals working within the New South Wales public health system (NSW Health).

Major resources available through CIAP include:
Australian Medicines Handbook
Harrison's Online
Journal databases – Medline, EMBASE, PsycINFO
MD Consult
MIMS Online
Therapeutic Guidelines
Micromedex
BMJ Best Practice
Various full text journals and eBooks

External links
CIAP website – password restricted to NSW Health employees

Healthcare in Australia
Health informatics